Events from the 1580s in the Spanish Netherlands and Prince-bishopric of Liège.

Incumbents

Habsburg Netherlands
Monarch – Philip II, King of Spain and Duke of Brabant, of Luxembourg, etc.

Governor General – Alexander Farnese, Prince (later Duke) of Parma

Prince-Bishopric of Liège
Prince-Bishop – Gerard van Groesbeeck to December 1580; Ernest of Bavaria from January 1581

Events
1580
 3 March – George de Lalaing, Count of Rennenberg, reconciled to Philip II of Spain
 9 April – English Fury at Mechelen
 7 May – Public disputation on the Eucharist in Brussels
 9 June – Taking of Diest by rebel forces
 9 August – Unsuccessful rebel assault on Enghien

1581
 30 January – Ernest of Bavaria elected as Prince-bishop of Liège
 11 February – Ernest of Bavaria elected Prince-abbot of Stavelot
 15 June – joyous entry of Ernest of Bavaria in Liège
 1 July – Catholic worship prohibited in Antwerp
 26 July – Union of Utrecht signs Act of Abjuration, repudiating Philip II of Spain as sovereign of the Netherlands
 Sack of Breda by forces led by Claude de Berlaymont
 30 November – Alexander Farnese takes Tournai

1582
 19 February – festive reception of Francis, Duke of Anjou in Antwerp
 30 April – Jesuit school opens in Liège
 21 December – Gregorian calendar adopted in the Southern Netherlands

1583
 17 January – French Fury at Antwerp: failed coup by Francis, Duke of Anjou
 16 February – Simon Stevin matriculates at Leiden University
 23 May – Ernest of Bavaria, Prince-Bishop of Liège, elected Archbishop-Elector of Cologne
 17 June – Battle of Steenbergen (1583)
 30 October – Joannes Hauchin consecrated as Archbishop of Mechelen
 2 November – Gregorian calendar adopted in Prince-Bishopric of Liège
 3 November – Taking of Aalst
 30 November – Philips of Marnix, Lord of Saint-Aldegonde, appointed mayor of Antwerp

1584
 7 April – End of the Siege of Ypres (1584)
 28 May – Bruges surrendered to Alexander Farnese
 17 August – Taking of Dendermonde
 17 September – Surrender of Ghent

1585
 10 March – Surrender of Brussels
 10 August – Treaty of Nonsuch: Elizabeth I publicly pledges support to Dutch Revolt
 17 August – Fall of Antwerp
 3 November – Relics of St Rumbold restored to St Rumbold's Cathedral

1586
 18 September – Alexander Farnese becomes Duke of Parma

1587
 15 May – Edict, ordonnance et instruction sur l'exercice et l'administration de la jurisdiction et justice militaire

1588
 29 May – Jean Vendeville consecrated bishop of Tournai
 22 July – William Damasus Lindanus installed as bishop of Ghent
 28 July – Battle of Gravelines

1589
 Ecclesiastical censorship of the press and the theatre established by Ernest of Bavaria, Prince-Bishop of Liège, Lettres patentes pour la conservation et maintien de la foy et religion chrestienne catholique apostolique romaine es païz de l'evesché et principauté de Liége (printed in Liège by Gautier Morberius)

Publications
1580
 Le Renart decouvert (Mons, Rutger Velpius) – a satire of William of Orange written anonymously by Jean Richardot

1581
 Nicasius Van der Schuere, Een cleyne of corte institutie dat is onderwysinghe der christelijcker religie ghestelt in locos communes (Ghent, Gauthier Manilius) – a Dutch abridgement of Calvin's Institutes (available on Google Books)
 Jean Michel, L'anatomie du corps politique comparé au corps humain, translated by Paul du Mont (Douai, Jean Bogard), available on Google Books

1583
 Justus Lipsius, De Constantia (Antwerp, Plantin Press)
 Statuta synodi dioecesanae audomarensis, anno M D LXXXIII (Douai, Jean Bogard) – the statutes of the diocesan synod called by Jean Six to introduce Tridentine reform in the diocese of Saint-Omer

1585
 Articulen ende conditien vanden tractate aengegaen ende ghesloten tusschen die Prince van Parma ende de stadt van Bruessele (Brussels, Jan Mommaert) – the terms of the surrender of Brussels

1587
 Sancho de Londoño, Discurso sobre la forma de reducir la disciplina militar a mejor y antiguo estado (Brussels, Rutger Velpius)
 William Allen's, The copie of a letter concerning the yeelding up of Daventrie unto his catholike majestie, by sir William Stanley knight (Antwerp, Joachim Trognaesius) – a justification of Sir William Stanley's surrender of Deventer
 Floris Van der Haer, De initiis tumultuum Belgicorum (Douai, Jean Bogard), the first substantial history of the origins of the Dutch Revolt (available on Google Books)

1588
 Jan Franco, Almanach oft journael voor't schrickel- jaer ons Heeren M.D.LXXXVIII (Antwerp, Joachim Trognaesius) – a calendar for the year 1588
 Statuta synodalia dioecesis Atrebatensis cum praedecessorum statutis adjectis (Arras, printed by Joachim Trognaesius for Claude de Buyens) – statutes of the diocesan synod of the diocese of Arras
 William Allen, An admonition to the nobility and people of England and Ireland, intended to be distributed in the event of a successful Spanish landing in England, printed anonymously by Arnout Coninx but never published

1589
 Francisco de Valdés, Espeio, y deceplina militar (Brussels, Rutger Velpius)
 I. B., The copy of a letter lately written by a Spanishe gentleman, to his friend in England in refutation of sundry calumnies, there falsly bruited, and spred emonge the people (Antwerp, Joachim Trognaesius) – counter-propaganda regarding the Spanish Armada
 Cort verhael vanden aenslach die d'Engelsche hebben aenhevanghen in Spaengien ende Portugael (Antwerp, Joachim Trognaesius) – an account of the English Armada's activities on the coasts of Spain and Portugal

Births
1580
 12 January - Jan Baptist van Helmont (died 1644), alchemist
 6 June - Godefroy Wendelin (died 1667), astronomer
 9 June - Daniel Heinsius (died 1655), Dutch poet and humanist

1581
 date unknown
 Frans Francken the Younger (died 1642), painter

1582
 11 April - Justus de Harduwijn (died 1636), poet
 24 September (baptism) - Deodat del Monte (died 1644), painter, engineer and art dealer
 date unknown
 Wouter Abts (died 1642/3), painter
 Jacob van Hulsdonck (died 1647), painter
 David Teniers the Elder (died 1649), painter

1583
 10 April - Nicolaus Vernulaeus (died 1649), New Latin playwright
 11/21 August - Samuel Blommaert (died 1651), director of the Dutch West India Company
date unknown
 Hendrik van der Borcht the Elder (died 1651), engraver and painter
 Henricus Calenus (died 1653), Jansenist clergyman

1584
 12 February - Caspar Barlaeus (died 1648), Dutch humanist
 18 November - Gaspar de Crayer (died 1669), painter
 date unknown
 Frederick de Marselaer (died 1670), mayor of Brussels and author of a treatise on diplomacy
 Willem van Nieulandt II (died 1635), painter and playwright
 Cornelis de Vos (died 1651), painter

1585
 25 February - Pieter van den Broecke (died 1640), merchant of the Dutch East India Company
 28 April - Philippe d'Outreman (died 1652), Jesuit author
 28 October - Cornelius Jansen (died 1638), theologian and bishop of Ypres
 31 December - Gonzalo de Córdoba (died 1645), commander in the Army of Flanders
 date unknown
 Lorenz van Steenwinckel (died 1619), architect

1586
 15 September - Antonius Sanderus (died 1664), ecclesiastical historian
date unknown
 Schelte a Bolswert (died 1659), engraver
 Gillis II Coignet (died 1641), painter
 Gijsbrecht Leytens (died 1656), painter
 Francisco de Moncada, 3rd Marquis of Aitona (died 1635), acting Governor General of the Spanish Netherlands, 1633-1634
 David Rijckaert II (died 1642), painter and art dealer

1587
 17 January (baptism) - Alexander Adriaenssen (died 1661), painter
 20 February - Emanuel Sueyro (died 1629), spymaster and historian
 23 April - Gaspard Nemius (died 1667), bishop of Antwerp and archbishop of Cambrai
 3 September - Libert Froidmont (died 1653), theologian and scientist
 18 October - Philippe-Charles, 3rd Count of Arenberg (died 1640), statesman
 17 November - Louis De Geer (died 1652), arms manufacturer
 8 December (baptism) - Martin Ryckaert (died 1631), painter
date unknown
 Maria Faydherbe (died 1643), sculptor
 Antonius de Liedekerke (died 1661), Dutch sea captain and diplomat
 Adriaen van Nieulandt (died 1658), Dutch painter and engraver
 Margriet van Noort (died 1646), Carmelite mystic

1588
 12 March - Herman de Neyt (died 1642), painter and art dealer
 9 May - Herman Hugo (died 1629), Jesuit author
 date unknown
 Jean de Beck (died 1648), governor of Luxembourg
 Jean-Jacques Chifflet (died 1660), physician to the Brussels court, antiquary
 Benedictus van Haeften (died 1648), Benedictine author
 Johannes van Mildert (died 1638), sculptor

1589
 6 April (baptism) - Jan Tilens (died 1630), painter
 2 July (baptism) - Guilielmus Messaus (died 1640), composer 
 15 July (baptism) - Cornelis Bol (died 1666), painter and etcher
 1 August - Alexandrine von Taxis (died 1666), postmistress general
 date unknown
 Abraham Govaerts (died 1626), painter

Year uncertain
 Boetius à Bolswert (died 1633), engraver

Deaths
1580
 1 August - Everard Mercurian (born 1514)
 15 September - Geert van Turnhout (born about 1530), composer
 26 October - Anna of Austria (born 1549), Queen of Spain, Duchess of Brabant, etc.
 23 December - Gerard van Groesbeeck, Prince-Bishop of Liège

1581
 19 January - Gillis Hooftman (born 1521), merchant and shipbuilder
 22 January - Joos de Damhouder (born 1507), legal scholar
 7 May - Alexander Utendal (born 1543/45), composer
 13 July - Jean Scheyfve (born about 1515), former Chancellor of Brabant
 23 July - George de Lalaing (born about 1550), count of Rennenberg
 19 September - Frans Pourbus the Elder (born 1545), painter
 date unknown
 Petrus Divaeus (born 1535), historian
 Willem de Pannemaker (born 1512/14), tapestry designer.
 Nicholas Sanders (born about 1530), former professor at Louvain, missing presumed dead in Ireland

1582
 24 May - Philip de Lalaing (born 1537), governor of Hainaut
 11 December - Duke of Alva (born 1507), former Governor of the Netherlands (1567–1573)
 date unknown
 Arnoldus Arlenius (born about 1510), humanist
 Hans Hendrik van Paesschen (born about 1510), architect

1583

1584
 10 July - William of Orange (born 1533) assassinated in Delft

1585
 10 March - Rembert Dodoens (born 1517), botanist

1586
 18 January - Margaret of Parma (born 1522), former Governor of the Netherlands (1559–1567 and 1578–1582)
 21 September - Antoine Perrenot de Granvelle (born 1517), former Archbishop of Mechelen (1561–1582)
 11 October - Jean Six (born 1533), bishop of Saint-Omer

1587
 14 July - Claude de Berlaymont (born ca. 1550), nobleman and commander
 19 September - Jacobus Pamelius (born 1536), theologian

1588
 17 March - Petrus Dathenus (born about 1531), translator of the Heidelberg Catechism and of metrical psalms into Dutch
 2 November - William Damasus Lindanus, Bishop of Ghent

1589
 5 January - Joannes Hauchin (born 1527), second Archbishop of Mechelen
 22 March - Lodovico Guicciardini (born 1521), Florentine merchant in Antwerp
 1 July - Christophe Plantin (born about 1520), printer and bookseller in Antwerp

References